Stevns Peninsula is a peninsula on Sjælland in Denmark. It is separated from Sjælland by the three streams Stevns Å, Tryggevælde Å and Kildeå.

The main town of the peninsula is Store Heddinge, and most of the peninsula is covered by the Stevns Municipality.

Stevns is best known for Stevns Klint, a white chalk cliff stretching  along the coast.

See also
 Tryggevælde

External links
 Tryggevælde Ryttergods

Peninsulas of Zealand
Geography of Stevns Municipality
Peninsulas of the Baltic Sea